The Bristol Herald Courier is a 39,000 circulation daily newspaper owned by Lee Enterprises. The newspaper is located in Bristol, Virginia, a small city located in Southwest Virginia on the Tennessee border.

The Herald Courier is in what the media industry calls a converged newsroom, meaning its online (heraldcourier.com) print (Herald Courier) and broadcast (WJHL-Johnson City) operations work together closely. Herald Courier reporters are trained to occasionally deliver webcasts of Bristol news, conduct TV "talk-backs" with WJHL and gather audio for daily stories. News Channel 11 reporters often have bylined stories that appear in the Herald Courier news pages. Under Media General, both operations provided content for TriCities.com, a subsidiary of Media General's Digital Media Department. The future of the website is said to be up in the air.

In 2010, the Herald Courier won the Pulitzer Prize for Public Service, the highest honor in American journalism, for "illuminating the murky mismanagement of natural-gas royalties owed to thousands of land owners in southwest Virginia, spurring remedial action by state lawmakers."

History

The beginning of the present Bristol Herald Courier came in August 1865. That was when John Slack founded the Bristol News, a publication which continued until after the turn of the century. In 1870, Slack launched the Bristol Courier, a weekly which became Bristol's first daily paper in 1888.
George L. Carter, founder of the Clinchfield Railroad, moved to Bristol in 1903 and founded the Bristol Herald. When Carter left Bristol in 1907 the Herald was combined with the Courier and became the Bristol Herald Courier.

The 1934 Carter Family song "It'll Aggravate Your Soul" mentions the newspaper.

On October 16, 1949, T. Eugene Worrell and a number of the city's leading businessmen launched the Bristol Virginia-Tennessean, first published in direct competition with the Herald Courier and the evening News Bulletin. After many months of intense rivalry, the Herald Courier and Virginia-Tennessean joined in a printing agreement allowing both to carry on competitively in news and editorial fields while enjoying economies afforded by joint operations.
	
In 1986, after 36 years of home deliveries, the Bristol Virginia-Tennessean succumbed to the trend of dying afternoon newspapers and was combined with the morning editions of the Bristol Herald Courier. The combined morning publication with three editions covered and circulated in nine Southwest Virginia counties, Upper East Tennessee and the City of Bristol.

January 1, 1998 marked the sale of the Bristol Herald Courier to Media General. It was sold to Berkshire Hathaway in 2012.

Under the new ownership of Berkshire Hathaway, Bristol Herald Courier has rebranded its online presence moving from "tricities.com" to "heraldcourier.com". The newspaper now operates only in print and online, and is no longer affiliated with the TV station WJHL.

Newsroom staff
The Bristol Herald Courier is located at 320 Bob Morrison Blvd in Bristol, Va. The BHC is the dominant news source for the Bristol and Southwest Virginia region and in 2008 and 2009 won five national journalism awards, including four from the Associated Press Sports Editors and one from the Southern Newspaper Publishers Association. The paper was a 2007 national finalist for online convergence by the Associated Press Managing Editors. In 2018, it was chosen as one of three finalists for the 2017 annual award in the Scripps Howard Foundation's Community Journalism category, for its feature, “Addicted at Birth.” It won the Scripps Howard Community Journalism award. The judges' comments included: "The newspaper, with a circulation of 16,500, investigated the problem from all angles, outlined solutions and educated the community. The impact is wide-ranging for taxpayers, hospitals, families and schools." "It not only reported what's happening but foreshadowed what the community could face in the future."

References

External links
 
 

Herald Courier
Daily newspapers published in Virginia
Pulitzer Prize-winning newspapers
Publications established in 1865
1865 establishments in Virginia
Pulitzer Prize for Public Service winners
Lee Enterprises publications